Best of My Love or The Best of My Love may refer to:

Albums
 Best of My Love (album), by Samantha Jade, 2018
 The Best of My Love, by Coco Lee, 2000

Songs
 "Best of My Love" (Eagles song), 1975
 "Best of My Love" (The Emotions song), 1977
 "Best of My Love" (Javine song), 2004